Olympique Alès is a French association football club founded in 1923, based in the commune of Alès. The Cévennes club currently plays in Championnat National 3 the fifth division of the French football league system. The club in the past has played for six seasons in Ligue 1.

Honours
 Champion of France D2: 1957
 Champion of France D2-Sud, the Ligue 2's predecessor: 1934
 Vice-champion of France D2: 1947
 Semi finalists at the Coupe de France: 1987 (eliminated by Girondins de Bordeaux 0–0, 2–2)

Coaches
 2007–2008: Olivier Dall'Oglio
 2021-2022: Stéphane Saurat

Current squad

References

External links

  

 
Association football clubs established in 1923
1923 establishments in France
Football clubs in Occitania (administrative region)
Sport in Gard
Ligue 1 clubs